Huon Bay is the ca. 8 mi wide bay between Cape Ducorps and Cape Legoupil, along the north coast of Trinity Peninsula, Antarctica.  Its head is fed by Ogoya Glacier.

A French expedition under Capt. Jules Dumont d'Urville, 1837–40, originally gave the name Huon to a cape in this area after Felix Huon de Kermadec, a member of the expedition. A survey by the Falkland Islands Dependencies Survey in 1946 did not identify the cape but applied the name to this bay which lies in the same area.

See also
Covadonga Harbor

References
 Huon Bay. SCAR Composite Antarctic Gazetteer.

Bays of Trinity Peninsula